Stoyan Lazarov (born 28 May 1951) is a Bulgarian wrestler. He competed in the men's Greco-Roman 62 kg at the 1976 Summer Olympics.

References

External links
 

1951 births
Living people
Bulgarian male sport wrestlers
Olympic wrestlers of Bulgaria
Wrestlers at the 1976 Summer Olympics
Sportspeople from Štip